The Howe of Fife is the broad, low-lying valley of the River Eden, lying between the Ochil Hills and the Lomond Hills in Fife, Scotland. Howe, in Scots means a hollow or a plain bounded by hills. The alternative terms Laich of Fife and the Valley of Eden have fallen from use, as has Stratheden, save for the hospital near Cupar.

Cupar-based Howe of Fife RFC take their name from the area.

References

Geography of Fife
Valleys of Scotland